Treat Conrad Huey and Purav Raja were the defending champions but Huey decided not to participate.
Raja plays alongside Divij Sharan, but lost in the first round to Gao Peng and Gao Wan.

Hiroki Kondo and Yi Chu-huan won the title, defeating Gao Peng and Gao Wan in the final, 6–4, 6–1.

Seeds

Draw

Draw

References
 Main draw

Men's Doubles